Deluciris  is a genus of flowering plant in the family Iridaceae, native to East Brazil. It was first described in 2018 by André Gil and Juliana Lovo.

Species
, Plants of the World Online accepted two species:
 Deluciris rupestris (Ravenna) Lovo & A.Gil
 Deluciris violacea (Klatt) A.Gil & Lovo

References

Iridaceae
Iridaceae genera
Flora of Northeast Brazil
Flora of Southeast Brazil
Plants described in 2018